Legionella taurinensis is a Gram-negative, oxidase- and catalase-positive bacterium from the genus Legionella with a single polar flagellum which was isolated from a water from a hospital oxygen bubble humidifier in Turin in Italy.

References

External links
Type strain of Legionella taurinensis at BacDive -  the Bacterial Diversity Metadatabase

Legionellales
Bacteria described in 1999